Gaëtan Missi Mezu Kouakou (born 4 May 1996) is a professional footballer who plays as a forward for  side Cholet. Born in France, he represents the Gabon national team.

Club career
Missi Mezu was born in Villeneuve-d'Ascq, France. He began his football career as a youngster with Toulouse Fontaines, and played for CFA2 club Balma before joining Valenciennes in 2014. He made six appearances in Ligue 2 for Valenciennes in 2015–16. He signed for Paris FC, newly relegated to the Championnat National, in June 2016.

In March 2019, he moved to Arsenal Kyiv and made his debut on the third of March.

In May 2022, Missi Mezu signed with Cholet in France.

International career
Missi Mezu made his international debut for Gabon on 28 May 2016 in a friendly match against Mauritania.

Honours
Dunărea Călărași
Liga II: 2017–18

References

External links

Living people
1996 births
People from Villeneuve-d'Ascq
Sportspeople from Nord (French department) 
Footballers from Hauts-de-France
People with acquired Gabonese citizenship
Gabonese footballers
Gabon international footballers
French footballers
Association football forwards
Balma SC players
Valenciennes FC players
Paris FC players
FC Dunărea Călărași players
FC Arsenal Kyiv players
FC Schaffhausen players
FC Ilves players
SFC Etar Veliko Tarnovo players
FC Tsarsko Selo Sofia players
Apollon Pontou FC players
SO Cholet players
Championnat National 3 players
Ligue 2 players
Championnat National players
Liga II players
Liga I players
Ukrainian Premier League players
Swiss Challenge League players
Veikkausliiga players
First Professional Football League (Bulgaria) players
Super League Greece 2 players
French sportspeople of Gabonese descent
Gabonese expatriate footballers
French expatriate footballers
Gabonese expatriate sportspeople in Romania
Gabonese expatriate sportspeople in Ukraine
Gabonese expatriate sportspeople in Switzerland
Gabonese expatriate sportspeople in Finland
Gabonese expatriate sportspeople in Bulgaria
Gabonese expatriate sportspeople in Greece
Expatriate footballers in Romania
Expatriate footballers in Ukraine
Expatriate footballers in Switzerland
Expatriate footballers in Finland
Expatriate footballers in Bulgaria
Expatriate footballers in Greece
French expatriate sportspeople in Romania
French expatriate sportspeople in Ukraine
French expatriate sportspeople in Switzerland
French expatriate sportspeople in Finland
French expatriate sportspeople in Bulgaria
French expatriate sportspeople in Greece
Black French sportspeople